Geoffrey Frank Grobecker MBE (1922–1989) was Archdeacon of Lynn from 1980 until 1987.

He was educated at St Paul's; Queens' College, Cambridge;  and Ridley Hall, Cambridge. He was ordained in 1950. After a curacy in Morden  he was a Chaplain to the Forces from 1952 until  1977. He was Vicar of  Swaffham from 1977 until 1980.

An Honorary Chaplain to the Queen, he died on 27 February 1989.

Notes

1922 births
People educated at St Paul's School, London
Alumni of Queens' College, Cambridge
Alumni of Ridley Hall, Cambridge
Members of the Order of the British Empire
Honorary Chaplains to the Queen
Archdeacons of Lynn
1989 deaths